Dong Guotao (born March 8, 1980 in Dandong, Liaoning) is a Chinese épée fencer. He competed at the 2008 Summer Olympics.

Major performances
2003 Asian Championships - 1st team/3rd individual;
2005 World Cup (Kuwait) - 6th individual

See also
China at the 2008 Summer Olympics

References

1980 births
Living people
Fencers at the 2008 Summer Olympics
Olympic fencers of China
Sportspeople from Dandong
Fencers from Liaoning
Asian Games medalists in fencing
Fencers at the 2006 Asian Games
Chinese male épée fencers
Asian Games silver medalists for China
Medalists at the 2006 Asian Games
Universiade medalists in fencing
Universiade silver medalists for China
Medalists at the 2005 Summer Universiade
Medalists at the 2007 Summer Universiade
21st-century Chinese people